Miloš Milivojević (born 17 November 1986 in Belgrade) is a Serbian football striker currently playing with FK Jedinstvo Putevi in the Serbian First League. 

He had previously played with FK Lokomotiva Beograd, FK BSK Borča, FK Mladi Radnik and FK Javor Ivanjica.

References

External links
 Miloš Milivojević Stats at Utakmica.rs

1986 births
Living people
Footballers from Belgrade
Serbian footballers
Serbian SuperLiga players
FK BSK Borča players
FK Mladi Radnik players
FK Javor Ivanjica players
FK Jedinstvo Užice players
Association football forwards